Death Journey is a 1976 action crime film written by Abel Joney and directed by Fred Williamson, who also stars as Jesse Crowder.

Plot 
Jesse Crowder is hired to transport a witness from Los Angeles to New York but instead befriends him and helps him evade his foes.

Cast
 Fred Williamson as Jesse Crowder
 Bernard Kirby as Finley
 Art Maier as District Attorney Virgil Riley
 Lou Bedford as Assistant District Attorney Jonas
 Heidi Dobbs as Agent
 Stephanie Faulkner as Agent
 Ed Kovins as Stern, The Mouthpiece
 Patrick McCullough as Jack Rosewald, Gang Leader
 Emil Farkas as Karate Instructor
 Sam Coppola as Detective Johnson
 Geoffrey Land as Judge
 James B. Campbell as Judge
 D'Urville Martin as Detective Don
 Tony Brubaker as Gas Station Attendant
 Jack Oliver as Detective Don
 Alexis Tramunti as Alice
 Jean Dancy as Woman At Gas Station

Sequel
Fred Williamson returned as Jesse Crowder in No Way Back.

Jesse Crowder character 
The Jesse Crowder character would be used in four or five films featuring Williamson. He first appeared in Death Journey then returned in No Way Back. He would be used again in Efren C. Piñon's Blind Rage, which was released in 1976. The character's final appearance was in The Last Fight, which was released in 1983.

According to The Hammer: an American Hero by Harold D. Edmunds, Williamson actually knew a guy in high school called Jesse Crowder. Crowder was a tough no-nonsense guy that nobody messed with. After the name was used in Williamson's films, Crowder took legal action against Williamson. The case went to court and Williamson's lawyer placed some phone books on the table and asked him which Crowder he was. Crowder realized he didn't have anywhere to go with this. In the end Williamson decided to cease using the Crowder character.

External links

References 

1976 films
1976 action films
1976 crime drama films
1970s crime action films
American crime action films
American crime drama films
Blaxploitation films
Films set in Los Angeles
Films set in New York (state)
Films directed by Fred Williamson
1970s English-language films
1970s American films